Songs from the Novel 'Greatest Hits' is the 14th studio album by British singer-songwriter, Kathryn Williams and a collaboration with the novelist Laura Barnett based on her second novel Greatest Hits.

The project was conceived from Barnett's interest in Williams' Hypoxia album centred on Sylvia Plath's 'The Bell Jar' novel and her concept of her own novel having a soundtrack of the protagonist, Cass Wheeler's music. Williams wrote the music to the 16 sets of lyrics in the novel Barnett uses to illustrate the events in Cass' life that bookend each chapter  along with producer Romeo Stodart .

The album and book were released simultaneously with The Irish Times suggesting the album ran 'gamut of emotions and musical styles from pastoral playfulness to jagged edged brittleness'

Track listing 
 "Common Ground"
 "Architect"
 "Living Free"
 "I Wrote You a Love Song"
 "Just Us Two"
 "Road of Shadows" s
 "Don't Step on the Cracks"
 "She Wears a Dress"
 "Lilies"
 "Brightest Star"
 "In This Garden"
 "Queen of the Snow"
 "Home"
 "Edge of the World"
 "Gethsemane"
 "When Morning Comes"

Notes
 All songs written by Kathryn Williams and Laura Barnett 
 Except tracks 3 and 4 written by Kathryn Williams, Laura Barnett, and Romeo Stodart 
 Track 6 written by Kathryn Williams, Laura Barnett, Michele Stodart, and Polly Paulusma 
 Track 13 written by Kathryn Williams, Laura Barnett, and Michele Stodart

Personnel 
 Kathryn Williams – vocals, piano, acoustic guitar, drum machine, bell, the twanger, toy piano
 Neill MacColl – e-bow, electric guitar, acoustic guitar, mandolin, autoharp, marxophone
 Romeo Stodart – electric guitar, acoustic guitar, piano, string machine, Hammond organ, marimba, backing vocals
 Michelle Stodart – bass guitar, percussion, bell, whistle, backing vocals
 CJ Jones – drums, congas, timpani
 Kate St John – oboe, saxophone, accordion, cor anglais
 Andy Bruce – piano, Hammond organ, wurlitzer
 Laura Barnett – backing vocals
 Recorded at Echo Zoo Studios, Eastbourne
 Produced by Romeo Stodart
 Engineered and mixed by Dave Lynch
 Additional engineering by Trevor Michael
 Horn arrangements on "I Wrote You a Love Song" by Romeo Stodart
 Horn arrangements on "She Wears a Dress" by Romeo Stodart and Kate St John

References 

2017 albums
Kathryn Williams albums
Music in Newcastle upon Tyne
One Little Independent Records albums